Mikhail Isayevich Milchik (born July 4, 1934 , Leningrad ) is a Soviet and Russian art historian , member of the Union of Architects of Russia (since 1984), member of the Councils for the Preservation of Cultural Heritage under the Government of St. Petersburg and the Ministry of Culture of the Russian Federation. His interests include  depictions of architecture on ancient Russian icons, wooden architecture of the Northern Russia, and fortifications architecture. He authored over 300 works, including 22 books, on various subjects related to architecture.

Awards and decorations
His awards and decorations include:
"Resident of Blockade Leningrad" badge
2008:  "For the preservation of the cultural heritage of Russia"
Серебряный диплом XVII международного фестиваля «Зодчество» за составление и научное редактирование книги «Архитектурное наследие Великого Новгорода и *Новгородской области», 2009 г.
2012: Petropol award for the book «Венеция Иосифа Бродского» (Venice of Joseph Brodsky)
Благодарственная грамота Правительства Санкт-Петербурга, 2013 г.
Благодарственная грамота Комитета по охране и использованию памятников Правительства Санкт-Петербурга (КГИОП), 2014 г.
2016: Tsarskoselskaya Art Award
Благодарность Министра культуры РФ, 2016 г.
Почетная грамота КГИОП Правительства Санкт-Петербурга, 2016 г.

References

1934 births
Living people

Russian art historians
Russian architectural historians
Herzen University alumni